Jungen may refer to:

André Jungen (born 1968), Swiss cross-country skier
Brian Jungen (born 1970), artist of Dane-zaa and Swiss ancestry working in British Columbia
Killien Jungen (born 1995), Dutch-French footballer

See also
Junge